Raheem Orr (born August 21, 1986) is a former American football and arena football defensive end as well as a fullback in the Arena Football League (AFL) and the National Football League (NFL) for parts of 5 seasons. He played High School Football at Yazoo City High School, and was recognized as an All-Conference player in 2004. After being drafted by the Houston Texans, Orr was released and ultimately signed with the New York Giants.

Raised in Elizabeth, New Jersey, Orr graduated from Elizabeth High School.

He had a son on February 1, 2006 with his partner, Khargan Makorney (b. 1988). They were never married. After a year off of football, Orr began playing for the Philadelphia Soul in 2006. Orr played briefly for the Grand Rapids Rampage in 2008, before returning to the Soul, helping them to an ArenaBowl XXII victory.

References

External links
AFL stats

1986 births
Living people
Elizabeth High School (New Jersey) alumni
Sportspeople from Elizabeth, New Jersey
American football defensive ends
Rutgers Scarlet Knights football players
New York Giants players
Philadelphia Soul players
Grand Rapids Rampage players
Players of American football from New Jersey